Irons is the surname of:

People 
 Andy Irons (1978–2010), American surfer
 Bill Irons, American evolutionary anthropologist and professor emeritus
 Bruce Irons (engineer) (1924–1983), English-born Canadian engineer and mathematician
 Bruce Irons (surfer) (born 1979), American surfer
 David Irons (born 1982), American football player
 Davie Irons (born 1961), Scottish footballer
 Edward Irons (1923–2022), American economist and writer
 Edward D. Irons Jr. (born 1954), American record producer and songwriter
 Eric Irons (1921–2007), Britain's first black magistrate and equal rights activist
 Ernest E. Irons (1877–1959), American physician, president of the American Medical Association, the American College of Physicians and the American Association for the Study and Control of Rheumatic Diseases
 Evelyn Irons (1900–2000), Scottish journalist and World War II war correspondent
 Frank Irons (1886–1942), American Olympic long jumper and high jumper
 Gerald Irons (1947–2021), American football player
 Greg Irons (1947–1984), American poster artist, underground cartoonist, animator and tattoo artist
 Grant Irons (born 1979), American football player
 Herbert Stephen Irons (1834–1905), English organist
 Jack Irons (born 1962), American founding drummer of the rock band Red Hot Chili Peppers and former member of Pearl Jam
 James Anderson Irons (1857–1921), United States Army brigadier general
 Janine Irons, British music educator, artist manager and producer
 Jarrett Irons, American college football player
 Jeremy Irons (born 1948), English actor
 Kenny Irons (born 1983), American football player
 Kenny Irons (footballer) (born 1970), English footballer
 Maleek Irons (born 1996), retired Canadian football player
 Max Irons (born 1985), English actor
 Norman Irons, Lord Provost of Edinburgh, Scotland
 Paul Irons (born 1983), American football player
 Paulette Irons (born 1952), American city court judge
 Peter Irons (born 1940), American political activist
 Robbie Irons (born 1946), American ice hockey player
 Steve Irons (born 1958), Australian politician
 Tammy Irons (born 1963), American politician
 William Josiah Irons (1812–1883), English priest

Fictional characters 
 Jonathan Irons, the main antagonist in the 2014 video game Call of Duty: Advanced Warfare
 Steel (John Henry Irons), a superhero in the DC Universe
 Kenneth Irons, a comic book evil mastermind
 Natasha Irons, a superhero in the DC Universe
 Vallery Irons, protagonist of the American television series V.I.P., played by Pamela Anderson

See also 
 Senator Irons (disambiguation)